= Jincai High School =

School in Shanghai, China

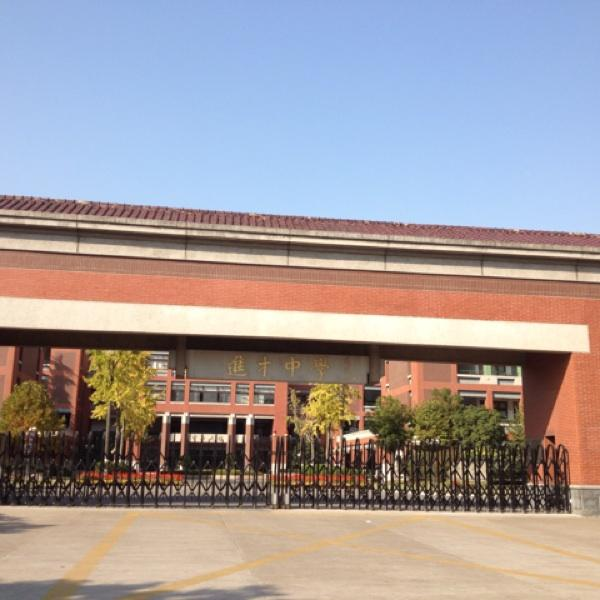

Jincai High School is a public boarding school in Shanghai, China. Founded in 1996, it was funded by Genlin Ye of Taipei with 130 million RMB. The current principal is Jie Hu (胡杰).

In 2005, Jincai High School became one of the first 'Beacon High Schools' in Shanghai. There are currently 1600 students in Jincai High School domestic division and 400 students in international division.

Jincai High School is located in Shanghai Pudong New Area.
